Nabil Arlabelek (born 27 July 1986, Marseille), better known by the stage name Naps, is a French rapper of Algerian origin. Coming from the Air Bel suburb of Marseille, he started rapping in 2001 at the age of 15. Two years later he formed Click 11.43 with two other rappers, KOFS and Sahime. The formation had considerable following particularly with the incarcerated population in France. Naps also released his own solo materials and collaborated with many other rappers. In January 2020, Naps announced that he has stopped all artistic activity and has destroyed his gold certified album.

Discography

Albums

Singles

As lead artist

*Did not appear in the official Belgian Ultratop 50 charts, but rather in the bubbling under Ultratip charts.

As featured artist

Other charted songs

*Did not appear in the official Belgian Ultratop 50 charts, but rather in the bubbling under Ultratip charts.

References

French rappers
Musicians from Marseille
Living people
French people of Algerian descent
1991 births